MS Gruziya was one of six Soviet s during the late 1920s built for the Black Sea State Shipping Company. During the Second World War, she participated in the Siege of Odessa in 1941 and the Siege of Sevastopol in 1942. The ship was sunk by a German bomber en route to the latter port in June; there were no survivors.

Description 
She had a pair of six-cylinder, two-stroke diesel engines, each driving a screw propeller, and the engines were rated at a total of 1,163 nominal horsepower. The ship had a designed capacity of 450 passengers.

Construction and career 
Gruziya was one of the two ships in the class that was constructed in 1928 at the Friedrich Krupp Germaniawerft shipyard in Kiel, Germany. After completion the ship was assigned to the Black Sea State Shipping Company by Sovtorgflot with its port of registry at Odessa.

After the invasion of the Soviet Union on 22 June 1941 (Operation Barbarossa) by Nazi Germany and its allies, Gruziya was used for military tasks. On 16–21 September, she served as a troopship ferrying part of the 157th Rifle Division from Novorossiysk to Odessa. A day after commencing the voyage, the convoy of which she was a part was fruitlessly attacked by German aircraft. The following month, the ship arrived in Odessa on 14 October in preparation to evacuate the city's defenders and was damaged by a German bomber. Gruziya loaded some troops and the convoy of which she was a part arrived at Sevastopol on the 16th despite repeated German air attacks.

After repairs were completed, the liner transported troops and supplies to the besieged garrison of Sevastopol on 18 and 20 May 1942 and evacuated wounded men on the return voyage. Gruziya and the destroyer  ferried 2,734 reinforcements to Sevastopol and returned 1,200 wounded on 28 May. Together with the minesweeper T-401/Tral and four patrol boats, the ship took 750 troops to Sevastopol and evacuated 850 wounded men and 724 civilians on 7 June.

On the night of 12/13 June, Gruziya was bound for Sevastopol with a cargo of ammunition on board that included chemical shells filled with Lewisite and mustard gas. Escorted by a pair of minesweepers, she was unsuccessfully attacked by Italian MAS boats. The following morning the convoy was attacked by German aircraft. One bomb landed in the aft cargo hold where all the ammunition was stored, detonating it. The resulting explosion blew the ship in half; there were no survivors.

References

Bibliography

 

Krim-class ocean liner
Ships built in Kiel
Ships sunk by German aircraft
World War II passenger ships of the Soviet Union
Maritime incidents in June 1942
World War II shipwrecks in the Black Sea